"Beware the Gray Ghost" is the eighteenth episode of Batman: The Animated Series. It was directed by series regular Boyd Kirkland and was first aired on November 4, 1992. The episode features guest star Adam West, best known for his portrayal of Batman in the 1960s Batman television series. West plays an actor known for his role as the Gray Ghost, a character that resembles Batman antecedent The Shadow.

Plot
The episode opens with a flashback of a young Bruce Wayne watching The Gray Ghost, a black-and-white television show, and the episode cuts between the flashback and events in the present, which mirror those of the show: a whirring sound is heard, a building is destroyed by an explosion, the Gray Ghost goes into action while Batman does the same in reality, and the police receive a ransom letter from "The Mad Bomber".

In the present day, Batman makes the connection between the explosion and the television show but does not know what happened as he fell asleep before it was over. He tracks down Simon Trent, the actor who portrayed the Gray Ghost. Now unemployed, typecast and short of money, Trent sells his Gray Ghost costume to toy shop owner and collector Ted Dymer. The next morning he finds his costume back in his apartment with an anonymous letter to meet in an alley. When Trent and Batman meet, Trent gives Batman a copy of the show from his personal archive (the production copies having been destroyed in a vault fire).

Learning the source of the whirring noises are remote-control toy cars armed with explosives, Bruce realizes the next target will be the Gotham Library. The library is defended from a wave of toy cars, but Batman is trapped by another wave of them. He is rescued by Trent, who is wearing the costume.

At the Batcave they discover a captured toy car has Trent's fingerprints on it, from which Trent realizes the Mad Bomber is Dymer, who reveals he is carrying out the attacks to raise money so that he can buy more toys. Batman and Trent capture Dymer, and his toy store and weaponry are destroyed.

Trent is hailed as a real-life hero, prompting a resurgence in the Gray Ghost's popularity. His complete archive of the Gray Ghost television series is released, providing him with both fresh income and a revitalized career. Bruce visits him at the product launch and asks for an autograph, explaining the Gray Ghost was, and "still is," his childhood hero. Realizing that Bruce is Batman, Trent smiles.

Voice cast
 Kevin Conroy as Bruce Wayne / Batman
 Bob Hastings as Commissioner Gordon
 Efrem Zimbalist Jr. as Alfred Pennyworth
 Mari Devon as Summer Gleeson
 Joe Leahy as Narrator
 Bruce W. Timm as Ted Dymer
 Adam West as Simon Trent / Gray Ghost

Reception
"Beware the Gray Ghost" has been very positively received by critics. The A.V. Club gave the episode an A and called it "smartly written and gorgeously animated".

Other appearances of the Gray Ghost

Film
In the 2018 film Teen Titans Go! To the Movies, a movie theater sign showcased a double feature of The Gray Ghost and Zorro.
 In Lego DC Batman: Family Matters, while Batman fights Two-Face in the movie theater, a film entitled "Beware the Gray Ghost" is shown on the screen.

Comics
 The Gray Ghost made a return appearance in an early issue of Batman: The Gotham Adventures in the late 1990s, and turned up again years later in the most recent Batman Adventures series in 2004, in a story about the making of a Gray Ghost film.
 The “Grey Ghost” appears in Batgirl vol. 2, #9 in 2011 during the New 52; he attempts to become the sidekick of Batgirl. His attire is similar to Dr. Mid-Nite, but in shades of gray, and he also wields a shotgun. His real identity is Clancy Johnson. He was killed by a mercenary group called "Order of the Scythe".
 In 2015, Simon Trent is introduced to the mainstream comic book canon in Gotham Academy, where he is a famous director and playwright who decides to become a teacher at Gotham Academy. He has a rivalry with Clayface.
 The Gray Ghost is a tribute to pulp/comic book hero The Shadow, in fact, his name is a reference to the titular villain from a 1936 issue of The Shadow's pulp magazine series. The Gray Ghost poster featured in the episode is based on the cover of "Shadowed Millions", one of The Shadow's novels, illustrated by Jim Steranko. Batman meets an aged Shadow in issues #253 and #259 of the comic series.
 In the Robin King's origin shown in Dark Nights: Death Metal: Legends of the Dark Knights, the movie the Wayne family saw at Monarch Theater instead of The Mark of Zorro was Beware the Gray Ghost.

Television
 In Batman Beyond, one of the original costumes for the Gray Ghost hangs in the Batcave, indicating that Bruce Wayne got Trent's wardrobe at some point. In the episode "Black Out", Wayne dons the hat and goggles of the Gray Ghost to hide his identity from Inque, who had infiltrated the Batcave.
 In the Justice League Unlimited episode "Epilogue", Terry McGinnis and his family are shown leaving a theatre playing "The Grey Ghost Strikes" while the Phantasm is waiting to murder his parents. This indicates that the Grey Ghost franchise continued to thrive well after the release of the television series. Although the Phantasm does not follow through, this scene parallels the traditional origin of Batman, where Bruce Wayne's parents are murdered as he and they leave The Mark of Zorro. The Justice League Unlimited comic series also referenced the Gray Ghost in the Christmas-themed issue #28. Superman mentions that he had also watched the show as a child, and he was terrified by it but still loved it. The Gray Ghost toys play a key role during the issue.

Video games
 The Gray Ghost appears in Lego Batman 3: Beyond Gotham, with Adam West reprising his role.
 A movie poster titled "The Ghost in Gray" starring Simon Trent appears in Oracle's clock tower in Batman: Arkham Knight with a depiction of The Gray Ghost.
 A movie poster for "The Gray Ghost" appears in Kirk Langstrom's laboratory in Gotham Knights.

Audio dramas
 The Gray Ghost, as a radio show, is referenced multiple times in Batman Unburied.

References

External links
 

1992 American television episodes
Batman: The Animated Series episodes
Works about actors
Television episodes about terrorism
Television episodes about television
Television episodes about termination of employment